Jorge Franco (17 September 1923 – 26 August 1989) was a Portuguese fencer. He competed in the team sabre event at the 1952 Summer Olympics.

References

External links
 

1923 births
1989 deaths
Portuguese male sabre fencers
Olympic fencers of Portugal
Fencers at the 1952 Summer Olympics